HC Rybinsk is an ice hockey team in Rybinsk, Russia.

History
The club was founded in 1959.

Their greatest achievement was being promoted to the Vysshaya Ligs for the 2003-04 season. They finished in 16th and last place in the Western Conference during their only season in the Vysshaya Liga. The club went down to the fourth-level Russian league, the Vtoraya Liga, for the following season.

External links
 Official website
 Team profile on eurohockey.net

Ice hockey teams in Russia